"Kim & Jessie" is a song by French electronic band M83. Written by Anthony and Yann Gonzalez with Morgan Kibby, it was released in July 2008 as the third single from M83's fifth studio album, Saturdays = Youth.

Critical reception
"Kim & Jessie" ranked number five on Pitchfork's list of the top 100 songs of 2008. Pitchfork's Mark Pytlik said that "with its apocalyptic electric drum hits, keening synths, icily detached vocals, and volcanic chorus, 'Kim & Jessie' not only ranked as the album's best song, but also combined with the similarly convincing "Graveyard Girl" to make one of the year's most potent 1-2 punches." Paste's Jeff Leven called it the album's "clear standout" and "one of the best songs of 2008." 
James Gwyther of Drowned in Sound wrote that "the processed vocals from Gonzalez and an overall air of nostalgia [...] combine to craft a delicious electro number." 
Glide Magazine's Chuck Myers explained that the song is "like hearing an alternate-universe version of the Psychedelic Furs, one where Richard Butler couldn't write memorable songs."

Accolades

Music video
Released in July 2008, the music video for "Kim & Jessie" ranked number 47 on Pitchfork's list of the top 50 videos of the 2000s. 
The video, directed by Eva Husson, depicts two teenage roller skating girls who, at the end of the clip, are seen kissing male roller bladers. Rob Simonsen of The Portland Mercury noted the video "seems simple enough" but that "the dark undertones are inescapable."
A Stereogum article stated that "whatever the first few minutes of the clip makes you assume about Kim & Jessie’s secret world, the ending will probably prove you wrong." 
Brandon Soderberg of Slant Magazine suggested the "make-out session [...] is an age and community acceptable transference for the characters' love for one another." Soderberg added that the ending "maintains M83's underlying sense of sadness and longing."

Track listing

Other uses
The song appeared in the 2018 racing game Forza Horizon 4.

References

External links
Watch the "Kim & Jessie" video on YouTube (240p)
Watch the "Kim & Jessie" video on Vimeo (360p)

2008 singles
M83 (band) songs
2008 songs
Songs written by Morgan Kibby
Mute Records singles